Wilshaw is a surname. Notable people with the surname include:

 Dennis Wilshaw (1926–2004), English footballer
 Edward Wilshaw (1879–1968), British businessman
 Michael Wilshaw (born 1946), Chief Inspector of Schools 
 Peter Wilshaw (born 1987), English cricketer

See also 

 George Willshaw (1912–1993), English footballer